Two ships of the Royal Australian Navy have been named HMAS Kanimbla, for the Kanimbla Valley in the Blue Mountains of New South Wales:

 , a passenger liner launched in 1935, requisitioned by the Royal Navy as an armed merchant cruiser in 1939, converted into a RAN landing ship in 1943, and returned to owners in 1950
 , an amphibious transport ship acquired from the United States in 1994 and decommissioned in 2011

Battle honours
Ships named HMAS Kanimbla are entitled to carry seven battle honours:
New Guinea 1944
Leyte Gulf 1944
Lingayen Gulf 1945
Borneo 1945
Pacific 1945
Persian Gulf 2001–03
Iraq 2003

References

Royal Australian Navy ship names